The 2016 Cadel Evans Great Ocean Road Race was a road cycling one-day classic that took place on 31 January 2016 in Victoria, Australia. It was the second edition of the Cadel Evans Great Ocean Road Race.

The race was won in a solo attack by Peter Kennaugh. He finished six seconds ahead of a group of 19 riders: the sprint for second was won by Leigh Howard with Niccolò Bonifazio third.

Result

References

External links 
 

Cadel Evans Great Ocean Road Race
Cadel Evans
Cadel Evans